Jorge Alberto Sábato (June 4, 1924 – November 16, 1983) was an Argentine physicist and technologist.

In 1955 he created the Metallurgy department at CNEA, and was its director up to 1968 when he became Technology manager of the CNEA. While with the CNEA he promulgated the Sábato triangle model, dealing with interrelationships between science, government and industry in promoting scientific and technological development.

In 1976 he was one of the creators of INVAP SE, he was the spiritual godfather, introducing the concept of "Technology Company".

In 1993 the Instituto Sábato was created as a result of all his effort towards the development of materials science in Argentina.

See also
CNEA

References
 Prof. Jorge A. Sábato Biography

Argentine physicists
1924 births
1983 deaths